Rob's House Records is an American record label based out of Atlanta, Georgia. It was created in 2005 by Trey Lindsay to cater to the unique, but underexposed growing underground music scene in Atlanta, Ga.  Rob's House Records caters to many genres of music including punk, indie rock, math rock, folk, and electronic. Its primary release format is 7-inch records.

History
The name Rob's House Records comes from the record label designation on a split 7-inch record released by Atlanta bands The Orphins and The Liverhearts in 2003. At the time of the release, neither band had any record label affiliation, and it was decided that the record would be self-released. Being that all the members of the bands lived in rented properties at the time of the release, it was decided that a more permanent address needed to be printed on the back of the label. A mutual friend of both bands, named Rob, owned a house in Atlanta and agreed to loan his address for the purpose. The name Rob's House Records was printed in the bottom left hand corner of the 7-inch record. Initially the name was intended only for this one release.

Two years later, Trey Lindsay of The Liverhearts, after returning from a study abroad program in Paris, abruptly quit The Liverhearts after deciding he wanted to focus on other projects. Lindsay began work on the creation of a record label that would help to promote the local underground music scene within Atlanta. The primary format of release would be 7-inch records. With permission from both The Orphins and The Liverhearts, the name Rob's House records was resurrected in 2005. In 2006, Lindsay recruited Travis Flagel to help with the growing label.

Discography
rhr001: The Orphins / The Liverhearts 7-inch 
rhr002: Anna Kramer 7-inch 
rhr003: The Selmanaires 7-inch 
rhr004: Shock Cinema 7-inch
rhr005: A Fir-Ju Well 7-inch  
rhr006: Rizzudo 7-inch
rhr007: Deerhunter/Hubcap City Split 7-inch 
rhr008: The Flakes 7-inch
rhr009: Mudcat 7-inch 
rhr010: Black Lips 7-inch 
rhr011: Herb Harris 7-inch
rhr012: Carbonas 7-inch  
rhr013: God's America 7-inch
rhr014: Zano w/ Chris Devoe & Mexcellent 7-inch
rhr015: Jason Harris 7-inch
rhr016: Thee Crucials 7-inch
rhr017: Nikki Sudden / Southern Bitch 7-inch
rhr018: Classic Plus 7-inch
rhr019: Jude Stevens (Pete DeLorenzo) 7-inch
rhr020: Old King Cole Younger/ Atlas Sound 10-inch
rhr021: All Night Drug Prowling Wolves 7-inch
rhr022: Deerhunter 7-inch 
rhr023: Saba Lou 7-inch
rhr024: Beat Beat Beat 7-inch
rhr025: Cheveu 7-inch
rhr026: SIDS - Acid One 7-inch
rhr027: Fe Fi Fo Fums 7-inch
rhr028: The Gaye Blades 7-inch
rhr029: The Gaye Blades 7-inch
rhr030: The Coathangers CD/LP
rhr031: Black Lips / Subsonics 7-inch
rhr032: Gentleman Jesse & His Men / Joseph Plunket 7-inch
rhr033: Baby Shakes 7-inch
rhr034: The Weakends 7-inch
rhr035: Demon's Claws - Fcked on K 7-inch
rhr036: Slab City 7-inch
rhr037: The Hipshakes 7-inch
rhr038: Jack Of Heart 7-inch
rhr039: Lover! 7-inch
rhr040: Hunx & His Punx 7-inch
rhr041: Sonic Chicken 4 7-inch
rhr042: The Selmanaires 7-inch
rhr043: Golden Triangle 7-inch
rhr044: Bobby & The Soft Spots 7-inch
rhr045: Black Lips / Carbonas / Gentleman Jesse / Predator 7-inch
rhr046: The Weakends LP
rhr047: Jacuzzi Boys 7-inch
rhr048: SIDS - Winter 7-inch
rhr049: Brimstone Howl 7-inch
rhr050: Demon's Claws - Weird Ways 7-inch
rhr051: Personal & The Pizzas / Bobby Ubangi 7-inch
rhr053: Bobby Ubangi - Inside the Mind of Bobby Ubangi LP

See also
 List of record labels

References

External links

 Pine Magazine Article
 Interview with label founder Trey Lindsay and Travis Flagel
Creative Loafing Article

Record labels established in 2005
American independent record labels
Indie rock record labels
Alternative rock record labels
Folk record labels
Electronic music record labels